Vermont Route 73 (VT 73) is a  east–west state highway in central Vermont, United States. It extends from VT 74 in Shoreham in the west to VT 100 in Rochester in the east. The route runs through parts of Addison, Rutland, and Windsor counties. The portion of VT 73 west of VT 22A is town-maintained and internally designated by VTrans as Major Collector 156 while the remainder of VT 73 is maintained by the state.

Route description

The route runs southeast into the town of Orwell, where it crosses Route 22A. Route 73 continues due east out of Orwell and into the town of Sudbury, where it meets Route 30. Route 73 turns north to join Route 30, and the two routes share a short concurrency before Route 73 splits back off to the east. It continues into the town of Brandon, intersecting with U.S. Route 7 in the town center. Route 73 briefly overlaps US 7 before splitting off to the northeast. The highway continues into the village of Forestdale (still in Brandon) where it meets the southern terminus of Route 53. Route 73 continues to the east in the town of Goshen before coming to an end at Route 100 in Rochester. The section from Brandon to Rochester was VT 115 and the section from Brandon to Orwell was VT F-10.

Major intersections

References

External links

073
Transportation in Addison County, Vermont
Transportation in Rutland County, Vermont
Transportation in Windsor County, Vermont